Pat Catney (born 11 November 1954) is an Irish Social Democratic and Labour Party (SDLP) politician and former publican who was a Member of the Northern Ireland Assembly (MLA) for Lagan Valley from 2017 to 2022.

Early life 
Catney was born in 1954 to Eileen (née McDonald, died in 2020) and James Catney, who ran the Kitchen Bar in Belfast, having previously run the Liverpool Bar on Donegall Quay. Before entering politics, Catney ran the Kitchen Bar, and was involved in the running of the parish centre at St Patrick's Church in Lisburn.

Political career 
He was elected to Lisburn City Council in 2011, and served as a councillor until he was elected to the Northern Ireland Assembly for the Lagan Valley constituency in the March 2017 election. He currently serves as the SDLP spokesperson for Small Business and Innovation.

Catney's office was picketed by Britain First supporters in 2018, for which the motive was unclear. Catney responded by saying "Such actions didn’t deter me then, and Saturday’s empty protest by this group will not deter me now," adding that "Lisburn is a city for all, Catholic, Protestant and dissenter – any message that undermines the good relations of this great city is not welcome."

In 2020, Catney put forward legislation in the Assembly to make period products available for free in all schools, colleges and public buildings, to combat period poverty. The bill was passed into law in March 2022.

He lost his seat in the May 2022 Assembly election, with the Alliance Party's David Honeyford taking the seat in the seventh count.

Catney announced he would be standing in the 2023 Northern Ireland local elections.

Personal life 
Catney married his wife Rosemary in 1982, and the couple have four children.

References

External links
 SDLP profile

Living people
Social Democratic and Labour Party MLAs
Northern Ireland MLAs 2017–2022
Place of birth missing (living people)
1954 births